Rashaan Shehee (born June 20, 1975) is a former running back for the Kansas City Chiefs.

Shehee attended Foothill High School in Bakersfield, California. He then played collegiately for the Washington Huskies.

He played 2 seasons in the NFL, both for the Chiefs. He started 5 games in 1999.  He continued his professional career in the short-lived XFL, playing for the Los Angeles Xtreme with "The Truth" as his nickname.

Shehee was inducted into the Foothill High School Hall of Fame in 2014, and the Bob Elias Kern County Sports Hall of Fame in 2016.  As of 2016, Shehee is a teacher at Bakersfield High School.

References

1975 births
Living people
Kansas City Chiefs players
Washington Huskies football players
American football running backs
Players of American football from Los Angeles
Los Angeles Xtreme players